Zoe Slater is a fictional character from the BBC soap opera EastEnders, played by Michelle Ryan. She made her first appearance on 18 September 2000. Zoe arrives in Walford along with her father, Charlie (Derek Martin), sisters Kat (Jessie Wallace), Lynne (Elaine Lordan) and Little Mo (Kacey Ainsworth), and grandmother Big Mo (Laila Morse).

It later emerges that Zoe is in fact Kat's daughter, and a product of incest after Kat was raped by her uncle Harry (Michael Elphick) in 1983, and Zoe was legally adopted by Kat's parents, Charlie and Viv. This was nominated for "Best Storyline" at the British Soap Awards as well as  winning "Best Single Episode" in 2002. Another highly proclaimed storyline was Zoe's friendship with Kelly Taylor (Brooke Kinsella). In 2003, Zoe and Kelly made headlines in the UK, in a New Year's Eve episode that was filmed on-location in Scotland. In the storyline, Zoe, Kelly and others, travel from London to Scotland but their minibus crashes, leaving them stranded and injured on the freezing cold Scottish moors. While stranded, Kelly cares for an injured Zoe and they become overemotional – and kiss. The episode featuring their kiss attracted 9.5 million viewers, and the precise moment that they kissed was watched by 44% of the available viewing audience.

One of Zoe's subsequent major storylines was when she became romantically involved with local hardman Dennis Rickman (Nigel Harman), which soon ended after Zoe ended up being entrapped in an affair with Dennis' father Den Watts (Leslie Grantham) – though not before he pressured her into claiming that she is pregnant with Dennis' baby, as part of his last-ditch attempt to stop his devoted adopted daughter Sharon (Letitia Dean) from leaving Albert Square; Dennis and Sharon had embarked on a forbidden romance during the former's relationship with Zoe. When Zoe starts to worry that Dennis will discover her secret, Den persuades Zoe to sleep with him so she can get pregnant – up to the point where he blackmails her with the threat of exposing her secret to Dennis. Although Zoe is forced to relent to Den's blackmail, Dennis ends up seeing them in bed together and ends their relationship. Her final storyline revolved around Den's murder on the show's 20th anniversary episode, after Zoe conspired with his estranged wife Chrissie (Tracy-Ann Oberman) and their friend Sam Mitchell (Kim Medcalf) to get revenge on Den for the way how he victimized them during his antics. Their plan resulted in Zoe seemingly killing Den in The Queen Victoria public house after he attacked Chrissie; however, when Zoe left his corpse behind, Den regained consciousness until Chrissie ultimately killed him for good – shortly before Zoe reappeared in the room where he was murdered. Soon afterwards, Zoe leaves Walford for Ibiza after making amends with Kat and Dennis.

Storylines
Zoe first arrives in Walford in September 2000 with her family, which consists of her sisters Kat (Jessie Wallace), Lynne (Elaine Lordan) and Little Mo (Kacey Ainsworth); their father Charlie (Derek Martin) and their grandmother Big Mo (Laila Morse). Over a year later, Zoe and Kat argue about Zoe's decision to move away from Walford to live with her uncle Harry (Michael Elphick). Kat tells Zoe she cannot go but Zoe walks out. Kat follows and blurts out that she is Zoe's real mother. She then explains that she fell pregnant at 13 after Harry raped her, thus revealing that Harry is her father. Zoe is shell-shocked, and Kat slashes her wrists in despair. Zoe runs away, unable to take in all the recent revelations.

While away, Zoe contacts Little Mo – the only other member of the family who did not know about Zoe's parentage – who persuades Zoe to come home, but after another argument with Kat, Zoe leaves again. She ends up living on the streets where she is discovered sick and penniless by Roxy Drake (Tracy Brabin), a pimp determined to recruit Zoe. Roxy provides Zoe with meals and cigarettes, finds her a flat and forces her to prostitute herself. Roxy and fellow prostitute Kelly Taylor (Brooke Kinsella) dress and make-up Zoe, but she gets drunk and vomits on her client. Kat arrives the next day to take Zoe home, but Roxy tries to prevent her taking Zoe, so Kat headbutts her.

Zoe gets engaged to Anthony Trueman (Nicholas Bailey), but leaves yet again, returning several months later, this time with Kelly in tow, and her engagement to Anthony is broken off. She briefly dates Dennis Rickman (Nigel Harman), but he is secretly in love with his adoptive half-sister Sharon Watts (Letitia Dean), and they eventually reveal their relationship. Sharon and Dennis' father Den Watts (Leslie Grantham) suggests that to keep Dennis, Zoe should claim she is pregnant, since Sharon is infertile. The plan works but Zoe worries Dennis will realise she is not pregnant, and he refuses to sleep with her. Den offers to sleep with her so she can get pregnant and pretend the baby is Dennis's. Dennis catches them in bed together and leaves, but not before telling Den's wife, Chrissie Watts (Tracy Ann Oberman).

Chrissie persuades Zoe to abort the baby and tells her they should team up for revenge on Den. They get together with Sam Mitchell (Kim Medcalf) to do this, meeting up in The Queen Victoria pub. Chrissie sends for Sharon, claiming Den is on his deathbed. She finds out that it isn't true and, upon learning what her father did to Dennis and Zoe, disowns Den before leaving Walford once more; Chrissie had planned this to rid Den of Sharon as payback for cheating on her for Zoe. Right after Sharon leaves, Den realizes what Chrissie did and proceeds to attack her – smashing her head against the jukebox. Zoe stops him by attacking him with a metal doorstop, supposedly killing him. She runs off and Sam goes after her to calm her down. However, he is not dead, and he grabs Chrissie. She hits him again with the doorstop, finally killing Den. Following his murder, Zoe is led to believe that she killed Den – though Sam sees Chrissie kill Den and eventually tells Zoe, who punches Chrissie. Zoe leaves for Ibiza after having an emotional goodbye with Kat, while Chrissie is eventually caught out and charged with Den's murder, and Sam subsequently goes on the run.

In 2015, Kat reveals that Zoe has moved to Spain and announces to Big Mo and Stacey Slater (Lacey Turner) that she will start saving up to visit Zoe. However, Mo tells Stacey that Zoe does not want to see Kat. Mo attempts to contact Zoe to get her to reconsider, but Kat finds out two days later in a text from Zoe that she cannot see her because of her new job and boyfriend and she feels she needs to move on with her life without Kat. In May 2015, Kat visits the convent where she gave birth to Zoe in 1984 and it is revealed to the viewers that Kat, unknowingly, had in fact had twins, a girl and a boy – meaning Zoe has a twin brother. Kat later moves to Spain off-screen and visits Zoe, who rejects her mother, leaving Kat devastated. Upon her return, Kat reveals that Zoe is now engaged.

In July 2022, it is revealed that Zoe has returned to London when Stacey’s daughter, Lily (Lillia Turner) tracks her down on social media and invites her to Kat’s upcoming wedding to Phil Mitchell (Steve McFadden). In an effort to cheer up Kat, Lily also arranges for Zoe to meet with Kat at Peggy’s bar that evening, but Zoe does not turn up, leaving Kat and Lily disappointed.

Creation and characterisation
The character of Zoe and the rest of the Slater family were created during workshops with Tony Jordan and John Yorke. London actors were invited to improvise in groups, and the characters were created during these improvisations. Michelle Ryan was cast as Zoe, and made her first on-screen appearance on 18 September 2000. The family consisted of, grandmother Mo Harris (Laila Morse), father Charlie (Derek Martin), his five children, Lynne (Elaine Lordan), Kat (Jessie Wallace), Little Mo (Kacey Ainsworth), Zoe (Ryan), Belinda (Leanne Lakey), who was to be introduced to EastEnders at a later date, as well as Lynne's boyfriend Garry Hobbs (Ricky Groves). It later transpired that Kat was the mother of Zoe, after being raped by her uncle Harry Slater (Michael Elphick).

According to the BBC's head of drama series, Mal Young, the family was brought in as the serial did not "have enough solid families in the soap, there were a lot of fractured families and people who were alone." Ryan was cast in the role of Zoe after the character was developed at an improvisation session for thirty actors and actresses earlier in the year. He chose Lordan, Wallace,  Ainsworth, Ryan and Lakey as the five sisters as they got on so well at the sessions. The actors performed a Nolan Sister's routine at the session, which was "later included on EastEnders as part of one of the Queen Vic's karaoke nights". The character is described as bolshy, defiant and a vivacious teenager who makes an impression on the men of Walford.

Development
In 2001, an upcoming storyline, involving Zoe and Kat, when Zoe asks if she can live with Harry.  The News of the World reported that Kat would tell Zoe that she was actually her mother and that Harry had raped her when she was 13. An EastEnders source said, "Zoe thinks her mother is dead—but the truth is very different." In 2002, a story where Zoe runs away with Anthony to get married in secret was announced. That year, Ryan was rested from the soap on doctor's orders, by agreement from Louise Berridge, the executive producer, Ryan and her parents. Plans for character developments between Zoe and Anthony were delayed and plans for their on-screen marriage were pushed back, with the wedding storyline being re-written. In September that year, Ryan said she would return and was looking forward to it, and Berridge said she was "delighted" and hoped viewers would look forward to Zoe being reunited with the rest of her family.

Notable relationships

Kelly Taylor
The friendship between Zoe and Kelly Taylor (Brooke Kinsella) was a recurring storyline for both characters. In the British press, Kelly and Zoe were compared to two former popular characters, who also shared a close screen friendship, Bianca Jackson (Patsy Palmer) and Tiffany Mitchell (Martine McCutcheon). Kinsella has commented, "It is nice to be compared because they were great [characters] but, hopefully, [Michelle Ryan] and I will bring our own characters to light and show what we can do. We have so much in common and we balance each other out – when she's crazy I'll calm her down and vice-versa. It's worked well, which is why Kelly has been kept on, which is great for me but also for Michelle because she's got somebody to have fun with. Kelly's been one of the slowest developing characters and that's been good for me. I wasn't thrown into it and having Michelle has been great for me."

A storyline featuring a kiss between Kelly and Zoe was featured in a New Year's Eve episode that was filmed on-location in Scotland. In the storyline, a group of teenagers travel from London to Scotland for New Year's Eve, but their minibus crashes, leaving them stranded and injured on the freezing cold Scottish moors. While stranded, Kelly cares for an injured Zoe, they become overemotional, and kiss. Kinsella explained the reasons behind the kiss: "They're stuck in the hills, thinking they're going to die—it's a way of saying goodbye and also of showing how much they love each other as friends. Which is quite sweet really." She claimed that the kiss was made easier due to the fact that she was kissing her off-screen best friend: "That made it so much easier. We thought we were just going to be laughing and giggling the whole way through, but we were very professional. It was so cold that we just wanted to get it over with. We were shaking from cold—not from nerves—and it was raining, so we just thought, 'Let's do it and get it done with'. [...] We laugh about it now. When it came down to it, the truth was that it was just like any other screen kiss." The episode featuring their kiss attracted  9.5 million viewers, and the precise moment that they kissed was watched by 44% of the available viewing audience.

Dennis Rickman and Den Watts
In September 2004, a Christmas storyline created by Berridge that was to show Zoe fall pregnant with Dennis Rickman's (Nigel Harman) baby was axed by Berridge's successor, Kathleen Hutchison. Instead, Zoe was to be seduced by Dennis's father, Den (Leslie Grantham). An EastEnders insider revealed: "Dirty Den lives up to his name by seducing Zoe. He makes his move when she comments how handsome he looks for his age. But they are caught in the act by Dennis who is shocked and disgusted to see his dad snogging his girlfriend." Hutchison decided that Den would be killed off in a storyline involving three people plotting to kill him. The storyline saw Zoe, Chrissie and Sam plot his death, and a source said, "The three girls team up after deciding they have to get rid of Den but viewers will be left wondering who the actual killer is. They plot and scheme to give themselves alibis and exact their revenge for what Den has done to them."

Departure

It was thought that Ryan was going to quit the soap after several reports of her leaving EastEnders. One of her friends who spoke in September 2004 revealed, "Without sounding arrogant, Michelle believes she has the looks and talent to succeed at the highest level. She has been in EastEnders for four years but sees her future very much in films and modelling. She realises the show has put her on the map but doesn't want to be typecast. "Because of her soap commitments she's had to turn down dozens of great modelling offers and feels her soap role is now holding her back. Michelle's happy to honour her contract but then will make the jump."

On 29 January 2005 it was announced after a lot of speculation that Ryan, along with Kim Medcalf (Sam), would be leaving. A source for the show said, "Michelle [Ryan] has made no secret of her plans to leave the soap in recent months. Despite her character being at the centre of some of the show's biggest storylines, the actress is now considering a modelling career." The source added, "Michelle is hot property and has been inundated with offers of other acting work. She's also had several offers of lucrative modelling projects." Speaking about her decision to quit she told The Sun, Everyone knew it was time for me to go and I knew it was time for me to move on."Then Jessie [Wallace], who plays my screen mum Kat, said, 'You're young, so get out there. Now's the time to go for it. You're only young once and you can't stay here forever.'
"I've grown up in EastEnders. I've been here for four years, so I will miss everybody. But you get that feeling and when you know it's time to spread your wings and fly, you need to do that. Everyone says I'm doing the right thing."
Her exit storyline was revealed saying,"She leaves because she can't stand everyone knowing what she did in order to persuade Dennis not to leave her," an insider told the newspaper. "It is truly gripping stuff and there won't be a dry eye in the house on the night."

Since her departure she told the Bristol Evening Post that she has no plans to return saying,"I just got quite bored in the end, to be honest. Doing the same thing day in, day out. It's just so boring. I like to jump from different things." "I always saw EastEnders as an apprenticeship," she told the Daily Record. "I always wanted to go on and do different things. I have some really good friends from that show but the door is closed." She said: "I've always taken chances. I think that's how you progress – by stepping out and doing different things. I really do like my freedom and jumping from job to job. I just want to work with people I admire and respect, wherever that be – big budget, low budget, leading role, supporting role."

Speculated returns
The press reported on 18 April 2010 that Ryan was approached by the producers of EastEnders to return for a month around the Christmas period that year, coinciding with the return of Zoe's on-screen mother Kat and her husband Alfie. A BBC spokeswoman denied this, saying, "Speculation is rife about returning characters but this is not true. However, as with all characters, we would never say never." Talking about these rumours she replied,"No, [it's] not for me."
It was again reported in August 2011, that Ryan was returning, for a Christmas special. They reported that she was "excited" over possible storylines with Wallace and Richie. A BBC
spokesperson dismissed the rumours, telling Digital Spy that there are no plans for Zoe to return. In April 2017, Ryan called for Zoe to be recast.

In popular culture
The character of Zoe Slater has been spoofed in the cartoon sketch show 2DTV.

Reception
In 2002, Zoe and Kat's storyline was nominated for 'Best Storyline' at the British Soap Awards, but lost out to the bullying plot in Brookside. The episode where the truth about Kat being Zoe's mother won 'Best Single Episode'. For her portrayal of Zoe, Ryan was nominated in the category of "Best Actress" at the 2005 British Soap Awards. For EastEnders 25th anniversary in 2010, Zoe finding out about her mother was voted the greatest EastEnders moment by What's on TV. Also the EastEnders website named the moment where Kat told Zoe that she was her mother one of the most 'dramatic endings'.

The kiss between Zoe and Kelly received criticism. Lesbian news site AfterEllen.com branded it a "gratuitous ratings-stunt" and said "The writers bottled out and the two young women dismissed it as a one-off, assuring each other that neither of them was 'like that,' leaving lesbian and bisexual viewers feeling cheated. This was a wasted opportunity, a chance to explore an emotionally complex situation between best friends that became just another exploitive TV moment instead." In an interview about homosexual television characters in The Guardian, scriptwriter Daran Little criticised lesbians in British soaps: "Most lesbian characters are so lipstick. They start off straight and, lo and behold, they just can't resist it. You can see the straight fantasy at work behind the character". Journalist Paul Flynn stated that Zoe was an example of this, describing her as a "tabloid-friendly 18-year-old—who [...] brushed with lesbianism for all of five minutes." Kinsella defended the kiss in an interview, commenting, "It's not a gratuitous ratings getting move, it's not some kind of big lesbian kiss. It's the way two best friends who have a lot of love for each other show their emotions."

See also
 List of EastEnders characters (2000)

References

External links
 

EastEnders characters
Teenage characters in television
Fictional market stallholders
Fictional offspring of incestuous relationships
Fictional offspring of rape
Fictional twins
Television characters introduced in 2000
Female characters in television
Slater family (EastEnders)